Niculas Harsha Fernando Kurukulasuriya (born 21 November 1992) is a Sri Lankan footballer who plays as a defender for Sri Lanka Champions League club Air Force and the Sri Lanka national team.

References

External links
 

Living people
1992 births
Sri Lankan footballers
Sri Lanka international footballers
Association football defenders
Air Force SC players
Sri Lanka Football Premier League players